Nyctimus is also a spider genus (Thomisidae)

In Greek mythology, Nyctimus (Ancient Greek: Νύκτιμος Nyktimos) was an Arcadian prince and the youngest of the 50 sons of the impious King Lycaon either by the naiad Cyllene, Nonacris or by unknown woman.

Family 
Nyctimus was the father of Periphetes, ancestor of Psophis, one of the possible eponyms for the city of Psophis. This can be explained by the following genealogical link: Nyctimus–Periphetes–Parthaon–Aristas–Erymanthus–Arrhon–Psophis.

Mythology 
Nyctimus' role in the death of Lycaon varies from source to source. One version tells that he was killed and served up as part of a feast to Zeus; and was later brought back to life. Another story claims that he was the only son of Lycaon to survive the blast of thunderbolts of Zeus as a result of the interference of Gaia, who quickly laid hold of his right hand and so appeased his wrath. In both versions, Nyctimus succeeds his father as king of Arcadia. His rule was short-lived, however, due to floods in the age of Deucalion, which some speculate was caused by the impiety of his brothers. 

According to Pausanias, Arcadia increased  in the number on both of its cities and population and Nyktimos who was the eldest son of Lycaon possessed all the power while his other brothers founded cities on the sites they considered best.

Interpretation 
Some scholars identify Lycaon with Zeus Lycaeus, Zeus in his role as god of light, who slays Nyctimus (the dark), or is succeeded by him, in allusion to the perpetual succession of night and day. 

The succession of Nyctimus to the throne of Arcadia was explained by Sir James George Frazier in his notes to Apollodorus' The Library:

... we may conjecture that among the ancient Greeks or their ancestors inheritance was at one time regulated by the custom of ultimogeniture or the succession of the youngest, as to which see Folk-Lore in the Old Testament, i.429ff. In the secluded highlands of Arcadia, where ancient customs and traditions lingered long, King Lycaon is said to have been succeeded by his youngest son [i.e. Nyctimus].See also
 Pelops

Notes

 References 

 Apollodorus, The Library with an English Translation by Sir James George Frazer, F.B.A., F.R.S. in 2 Volumes, Cambridge, MA, Harvard University Press; London, William Heinemann Ltd. 1921. ISBN 0-674-99135-4. Online version at the Perseus Digital Library. Greek text available from the same website.
 Pausanias, Description of Greece with an English Translation by W.H.S. Jones, Litt.D., and H.A. Ormerod, M.A., in 4 Volumes. Cambridge, MA, Harvard University Press; London, William Heinemann Ltd. 1918. . Online version at the Perseus Digital Library
 Pausanias, Graeciae Descriptio. 3 vols. Leipzig, Teubner. 1903.  Greek text available at the Perseus Digital Library.
 Titus Flavius Clemens, Exhortation against the Pagans'' translated by Butterworth, G W. Loeb Classical Library Volume 92. Cambridge, MA. Harvard Universrity Press. 1919. Online version at theio.com

Sons of Lycaon
Princes in Greek mythology
Mythological kings of Arcadia
Kings in Greek mythology
Arcadian characters in Greek mythology
Arcadian mythology